Novo-Bulgary is a rural locality (a selo) and the administrative center of Novo-Bulgarinsky Selsoviet in Ikryaninsky District, Astrakhan Oblast, Russia. The population was 489 as of 2010. There are 12 streets.

Geography 
Novo-Bulgary is located 24 km northeast of Ikryanoye (the district's administrative centre) by road. Bakhtemir is the nearest rural locality.

References 

Rural localities in Ikryaninsky District